Jiuniang (also called láozāo, jiāngmǐjiǔ, or tiánbáijiǔ in Yunnan) is a sweet, soup- or pudding-like dish in Chinese cuisine. It is also known as sweet wine or sweet rice wine. It consists of a mixture of partially digested rice grains floating in a sweet saccharified liquid, with small amounts of alcohol (1.5–2%) and lactic acid (0.5%). It is made by fermenting glutinous rice with a starter called Jiuqu containing Rhizopus oryzae or Aspergillus oryzae and often yeast and bacteria. 

It was first developed as a by-product of mijiu production and generally speaking is partially digested and fermented rice from a young rice wine (or vinegar) ferment. If eaten quickly or held at 10 degrees or less which halts the fermentation, the product can be consumed as Jiuniang. If the temperatures are raised and fermentation continues, Jiuniang will eventually produce rice wine or rice vinegar. Jiuniang is most commonly made and consumed in the winter, where fermentation can be halted easily.

Often jiuniang is translated to rice sauce or even rice wine (due to its alcohol content) by western Chinese retailers. It is often made with sweet osmanthus flowers and the dish is called guihua jiuniang.

Service
Jiuniang is often served together with small unfilled tangyuan during the Dongzhi Festival, a Chinese winter holiday dedicated to the ancestors. When served in such a manner it is called jiuniang tangyuan or jiuniang yuanzi, or  white wine soup bubble baijiu tangyuan in Yunnan, or, with Sweet Osmanthus, guihua jiuniang tangyuan. All forms of jiuniang are typically eaten with a spoon.

Similar dishes
An almost identical food product is made in SE Asia. In the Philippines it is called Binubudan, in Thailand it is called Khao Mak, whilst in Malaysia or Indonesia it is called Tapai. In Indonesia it most popularly made with purple/black glutinous rice, hence it is called Tapai Ketan.

It is also similar to the southern Vietnamese dish cơm rượu, which usually contains balls of rice. It is also similar to the Korean sikhye and Japanese amazake, although these are thin in texture and considered drinks rather than soups or puddings.

See also
Rice pudding
Mijiu
Amazake – Japanese equivalent of Jiuniang
Sikhye – Korean equivalent of Jiuniang
Gamju
Tapai

References

Further reading
 History of the later Han * Volume 32:  《后汉书。樊传》：“又野王岁献甘醪膏饧。”李贤注：“醪，醇酒汁滓相将也。”引伸为浊酒。

External links
Jiuniang page

Chinese alcoholic drinks
Chinese desserts
Chinese soups
Rice pudding
Rice wine